A. vinifera  may refer to:
 Acrocomia vinifera, a synonym forAcrocomia aculeata, a palm tree species native to Mexico, Paraguay and Argentina
 Aeria vinifera, a synonym for Pseudophoenix vinifera, a palm tree species  endemic to Hispaniola

See also
 Vinifera (disambiguation)